Robert Peter Burke (born 1962) is a retired United States Navy admiral who last served as the commander of United States Naval Forces Europe-Africa and Allied Joint Force Command Naples from 17 July 2020 to 27 June 2022. He served as Vice Chief of Naval Operations from 10 June 2019 until 29 May 2020, having previously served as the 58th Chief of Naval Personnel from 27 May 2016 to 23 May 2019.

Early life and education
Burke was raised in Portage, Michigan, and holds bachelor's and master's degrees in electrical engineering from Western Michigan University and the University of Central Florida.

Naval career
He has deployed to the Arctic, North Atlantic, Mediterranean, and Western Pacific.

Burke commanded  in Norfolk, Virginia, and was commodore of Submarine Development Squadron (DEVRON) 12 in Groton, Connecticut. During his tenure as commanding officer, Burke was recognized by the United States Submarine League with the Jack Darby Award for Leadership for 2004, and the Vice Admiral James Bond Stockdale Award for Inspirational Leadership for 2005.

Burke's staff assignments included tours as an instructor and director of the Officer Department Electrical Engineering Division at Naval Nuclear Power School in Orlando, Florida; junior board member on the Pacific Fleet Nuclear Propulsion Examining Board; and as the Submarine Officer Community manager/Nuclear Officer Program manager in the office of the Director, Military Personnel Plans and Policy Division (N13).

Following command, Burke held assignments as senior member, Tactical Readiness Evaluation Team, on the staff of Commander, Submarine Force, United States Atlantic Fleet; as the deputy director for Operations, Strategy and Policy Directorate (J5), at United States Joint Forces Command; as the division director, Submarine/Nuclear Power Distribution (PERS-42) and Nuclear Propulsion Program Manager (N133), Director, Joint and Fleet Operations (N3/N5), United States Fleet Forces Command and most recently as deputy commander, United States Sixth Fleet, director of Operations (N3), United States Naval Forces Europe-Africa and commander, Submarine Group 8.

Burke was awarded an Honorary Officer of the Order of Australia on 24 August 2020 with the citation being "For distinguished service in strengthening the military alliance between Australia and the United States of America".

Burke is set to retire from active duty.

Awards and decorations

The Naval Submarine League recognized Burke with the Jack Darby Award for Leadership in 2004. Burke also received the Vice Admiral James Bond Stockdale Award for Inspirational Leadership in 2005.

References

|-

|-

1962 births
Living people
Place of birth missing (living people)
People from Portage, Michigan
Western Michigan University alumni
University of Central Florida alumni
United States submarine commanders
Recipients of the Vice Admiral James Bond Stockdale Award for Inspirational Leadership
United States Navy admirals
Recipients of the Defense Distinguished Service Medal
Recipients of the Navy Distinguished Service Medal
Recipients of the Defense Superior Service Medal
Recipients of the Legion of Merit
Honorary Officers of the Order of Australia
Military personnel from Michigan